Aleyrodes millettiae is a whitefly species named by François Cohic in 1968.

References 

Whiteflies
Insects described in 1968